The Ji'an Yalu River Border Railway Bridge is a single-track railway bridge that spans the Yalu River and connects the outskirts of the Chinese town of Ji'an in Jilin Province with the North Korean town of Manp'o in Chagang Province.

The bridge is 589.23 meters long and its height is 16 meters. It was constructed between 1937 and July 31, 1939 by Imperial Japan which during this time controlled both Korea and northeast China (through the puppet state of Manchukuo).  A fortification near the Chinese end of the bridge dates from the same period. A square arch was added to the Chinese end of the bridge in 2004.

The bridge was used for shipping troops from China into Korea during the Korean War and was targeted by US aerial bombing; however, it was not destroyed.

From the Chinese side, the bridge is accessible for tourists who can walk up to a line close to the actual border.

A new Ji'an Yalu River Border Road Bridge located upstream was completed and opened in April 2019.

References

See also
 Sino–Korean Friendship Bridge and New Yalu River Bridge (Dandong City)
 Linjiang Yalu River Bridge
 Changbai-Hyesan International Bridge
 Tumen Border Bridge (Tumen City)
 Tumen River Bridge (Hunchun City)

Bridges completed in 1939
Railway bridges in China
Buildings and structures in Jilin
Transport in Jilin
Yalu River